Richard Eugene Phillips (November 24, 1931 – March 29, 1998) was an American professional baseball player, manager and coach. A native of Racine, Wisconsin, who attended Valparaiso University, Phillips batted left-handed, threw right-handed, stood 6 feet (1.8 m) tall and weighed 180 pounds (82 kg).

Phillips' playing career extended from  through , with time out for service in the United States Marine Corps during the Korean War. An outfielder when he broke into baseball, he later was a first baseman, second baseman and shortstop. He spent his first decade in professional baseball in the minor leagues, mostly in the farm systems of the Milwaukee Braves and San Francisco Giants. 

After he won the 1961 Pacific Coast League MVP Award, the Giants gave the 30-year-old Phillips his first Major League opportunity at the outset of the  season; however, he went hitless in three at bats and was returned to the minors at the May roster cutdown. The following season, the Giants sold Phillips' contract to the Washington Senators where he would spend the entire  and  campaigns on Washington's roster, starting 67 games at first base for the 1963 Senators and 52 more there in 1964. In 1965, he returned to the minors, as a first baseman with the Senators' Triple-A Hawaii Islanders affiliate. Apart from a late-season call-up in 1966, he spent the remainder of his playing career with Hawaii. 

As a Major Leaguer, Phillips compiled a lifetime batting average of .229, with 136 hits, 12 home runs and 60 runs batted in.

Phillips remained in the game after his playing career ended, scouting for the Pittsburgh Pirates and managing in the farm systems of the Minnesota Twins, San Diego Padres and Milwaukee Brewers from 1973 to 1979 and 1981 to 1983. He also spent the  season as a coach with the Padres under manager Jerry Coleman. In his final professional baseball assignments, he managed in independent league baseball in 1995–96.

Phillips served as manager of the PCL's Vancouver Canadians in 1982–83, and also was the team's assistant general manager during the early 1990s. 

He died in Burnaby, British Columbia, at the age of 66.

References

External links

1931 births
1998 deaths
American expatriate baseball people in Canada
Atlanta Crackers players
Baseball players from Wisconsin
Eau Claire Braves players
Evansville Braves players
Fulton Railroaders players
Hawaii Islanders managers
Hawaii Islanders players
Jacksonville Braves players
Major League Baseball first basemen
Minor league baseball managers
Pacific Coast League MVP award winners
People from Burnaby
Pittsburgh Pirates scouts
Sportspeople from Racine, Wisconsin
Sacramento Solons players
Saginaw Jacks players
San Diego Padres coaches
San Francisco Giants players
Sportspeople from the Milwaukee metropolitan area
Tacoma Giants players
Washington Senators (1961–1971) players
Wichita Braves players